The 59th New Brunswick Legislative Assembly consisted of the members elected in the 2018 general election and subsequent by-elections. The legislature was dissolved on August 17, 2020 in advance of the 2020 New Brunswick general election.

Party standings

Leadership

The incumbent Premier of New Brunswick Brian Gallant (Liberal) received permission from Lieutenant Governor Jocelyne Roy-Vienneau to attempt to form a minority government. While Gallant's Liberals finished second in the election by one seat to the Progressive Conservatives, neither party had enough seats to constitute a majority and as incumbent Gallant was given the opportunity first to attempt to form a government.

On November 1, 2018 Gallant's minority government was defeated by a non-confidence vote. Roy-Vienneau then asked Blaine Higgs of the Progressive Conservative party, to form a minority government on November 9, 2018.

History

The election resulted in the first minority government in New Brunswick since 1920. Despite the fact that the Progressive Conservatives ended up winning one more seat than his party, premier Brian Gallant sought and received permission to attempt to form a government. Following Gallant's government's defeat in a non-confidence vote (November 1), Blaine Higgs was appointed as the new premier on November 9, shortly after Gallant's resignation earlier that day.

Seating plan

Members

Standings changes in the 59th Assembly

See also
2014 New Brunswick general election
2018 New Brunswick general election
Legislative Assembly of New Brunswick

References

Terms of the New Brunswick Legislature
2018 establishments in New Brunswick
2020 disestablishments in New Brunswick
2018 in New Brunswick
2019 in New Brunswick
2020 in New Brunswick
2018 in Canadian politics
2019 in Canadian politics
2020 in Canadian politics
Minority governments